This article discusses the list of cities within Malaysia. In Malaysia, cities (Malay: bandaraya) are officially designated under the governance of city councils (Malay: Majlis bandaraya), although there are several exceptions. As of 2022, 19 areas in the country are officially termed cities by law. Among them, 16 are from Peninsular Malaysia, while 3 are in East Malaysia. George Town, the capital city of Penang, was declared as a city on 1 January 1957 by Elizabeth II, Queen of the United Kingdom, making it the first city in the country, and the only city declared before Malayan independence. George Town remained the sole city of Malaya until 1963, when Singapore was formally incorporated into Malaysia. However, Singapore's expulsion in 1965 meant that George Town would remain as Malaysia's only city until Kuala Lumpur's declaration as a city in 1972, by Abdul Halim of Kedah, the fifth Yang di-Pertuan Agong of Malaysia. In 1988, Kuching was chartered as the first city in East Malaysia. Kuantan is the most recent municipality in the country declared a city, doing so in February 2021.

There are also highly urbanised and populated areas across the country that did not attain city status, but are sometimes referred as cities. Officially, these areas are classified as municipalities or townships.

Cities in Malaysia

Current cities

Former cities

History

Penang
George Town became a city on 1 January 1957 by a royal charter granted by Her Majesty Queen Elizabeth II, becoming the first town in the Federation of Malaya to become a city (Singapore became a city in 1951). The royal charter stated that :"... the said Municipality of George Town shall on the First Day of January in the year of Our Lord One thousand nine hundred and fifty-seven and forever after that be a city and shall be called and styled the CITY OF GEORGE TOWN instead of the Municipality of George Town and shall thenceforth have all such rank, liberties, privileges and immunities as are incident to a City."However, local government elections were abolished by the federal government in 1965, and the functions of the City Council were transferred to the Chief Minister of Penang in 1966. A Municipal Council for the whole of Penang Island, the Penang Island Municipal Council, was set up between 1974 and 1976.

Although the city status of George Town was never officially revoked, George Town's existence as a corporate entity was in doubt, let alone as a city. This is similar to the position of the former city of Rochester in England, the site of England's second-oldest cathedral, which had been a city from 1211 until 1998 when it was merged with a neighbouring borough. As the new council was not granted city status, and the city, through oversight, failed to appoint charter trustees to inherit the city charter, the city ceased to exist.

Most residents disagreed with this view, who held that as George Town's city status has never been revoked, it remains a city to this day. According to lawyer Datuk Anwar Fazal, George Town "legally has been and is still a city because the City of George Town Ordinance 1957 had not been repealed".[3] As city status is a matter of law, the actual legal position will depend on an analysis of the City Council of Penang (Transfer of Functions) Order 1966 and the Local Government Act 1976.

On 1 January 2015, the Malaysian federal government upgraded the Penang Island Municipal Council into the present-day Penang Island City Council, thereby expanding the city limit of George Town to encompass the entirety of Penang Island, as well as a handful of surrounding islets.

Subsequent cities
The royal charters for Kuala Lumpur, Kuching, Kota Kinabalu, Shah Alam, Malacca City, Alor Setar and Miri were from the Malaysian head of state, the Yang di-Pertuan Agong, while Ipoh, Johor Bahru, Iskandar Puteri and Subang Jaya were granted by their respective state sultans. Malacca City was declared a "historical city" prior to being granted city status in 2003.

Kuala Lumpur, the largest city, is the national capital and a federal territory, but as of 2012, most government ministries have relocated to the new administrative capital of Putrajaya.

Criteria
Local governments or local authorities in Malaysia (Malay: pihak berkuasa tempatan, abbreviated PBT) are placed under the jurisdiction of their respective state governments. On the other hand, the Ministry of Housing and Local Government (Malay: Kementerian Perumahan dan Kerajaan Tempatan, abbreviated as KPKT) handles the classification and standardisation of local governments while providing them with consultations services (i.e. technical consultancy and federal funding). For the Federal Territories, their respective local governments are monitored by the Ministry of Federal Territories and Urban Wellbeing (Malay: Kementerian Wilayah Persekutuan, abbreviated KWP). The National Council of Local Governments (Malay: Majlis Negara Kerajaan Tempatan, abbreviated as MNKT), formed in 1960 by the federal government, is tasked on handling policies and laws related to local governments.

KPKT formally classifies local governments in three different categories: city councils, municipal councils, and district councils, with exceptions equivalent to the three respective categories. These categories are separated by certain requirements related to urban population, finances, and infrastructural developments. The 60th meeting of the MNKT, held on 3 June 2008, approved updated criterion on the selection process for the granting of city status on a local government:

 The local government must administer a region that is an administrative centre of a state;
 The region must have a population of more than 500-thousand people;
 The local government must be financially sustainable, with an annual income of not less than 100-million ringgit, and has the ability to afford stable administrative expenditures;
 The local government must have an efficient bureaucratic structure, while maintaining public services at the highest-level, e.g. tax collection, development approvals, legal enforcement, and other necessary functions;
 Urban developments planned by the local government should be sustainable;
 The local government should give further emphasis on resolving social issues, i.e. squatting, pollution, safety, affordable housing, and environmental conservation. Studies conducted by the Malaysian Urban Indicators Network (MURNInet) would also be taken account of.
 The local government must promote an urban image that is applicable towards the national identity as a representation of the country's heritage, and preserve any local objects or places of historical, cultural, or artistic significance;
 The region must contain adequate resources and institutions of finance and industry to easily facilitate trade and foreign investments;
 The region must be a local hub of education, complete with universities, colleges, museums and public libraries;
 The region must be a centre of culture, sports, and recreation;
 The local government should have the ability to host conventions of national and international level;
 The infrastructure of the region should be complete, with sufficient public utilities (e.g.'' disabled-persons friendly-public parks, public transportation, traffic management systems, road networks, computer services), and;
 The region must achieve nationwide or international recognition equivalent to those of other cities worldwide.

Locations of cities

Population 

Kuala Lumpur is by far the largest urban area as well as the largest metropolitan area in Malaysia. Johor Bahru, the capital city of Johor, is the second largest city in Malaysia and the heart of Malaysia's second largest conurbation. To the north, George Town forms the core of the third largest metropolitan area in the country, which is Greater Penang Conurbation. Other metropolitan areas with a population of more than 500,000 include Ipoh, Kuching, and Kota Kinabalu.

The following table shows the largest cities by population in Malaysia.

See also
 List of capitals in Malaysia
 List of cities in Malaysia by population
 List of cities and towns in Malaysia by population
 List of local governments in Malaysia

References

Citations

Bibliography

Government documents and announcements

Government-published statistics

Articles from magazines, newspapers and websites

External links

Malaysia
Cities